Johnson City is an unincorporated community in St. Clair County, in the U.S. state of Missouri.

History
Johnson City was platted in 1867, and named after incumbent President Andrew Johnson.  A post office called Johnson City was established in 1871, and remained in operation until 1904.

References

Unincorporated communities in St. Clair County, Missouri
Unincorporated communities in Missouri